Fung Ka Ki (born 19 September 1977 in Hong Kong) is a Hong Kong football coach and former professional player.

Club career
He was the team captain when he took part in 2000 Sydney Olympics Qualifiers, Hong Kong Rangers FC and Kitchee. He has also represented Hong Kong in FIFA international matches.

He has recently signed for Bromsgrove District League Division Side, Nailers Arms FC. Manager Stuart Day stated that this represented one of the club's most important signings in their esteemed history.

Managerial career

Birmingham City
In 2010, Fung Ka Ki was hired by Birmingham City to be a financial officer following the takeover of the club by Hong Kong businessman Carson Yeung. He was often spotted in the stands on matchdays, sitting behind Yeung.

Lee Man
On 3 July 2017, it was revealed that Fung would be hired as manager of Lee Man for the 2017–18 season. On 10 April 2018, Fung confirmed that he had resigned with Lee Man in 8th place at the time.

Personal information
He was a football commentator in Cable TV Hong Kong since 2005, he mainly hosts program for Bundesliga and Premier League.

During the 2006 FIFA World Cup, Fung Ka Ki hosted the program "Around the World in 80 Days" for the cable TV Hong Kong. Inside the episode, Fung and his crew travel and visiting 6 continents, 32 World Cup finalist participating countries. It is believed that the duration of his around-the-world travel shooting is more than 100 days. However, his contract termination with Kitchee had been into debate, he as very few football player to take the initiative to resign.

2008 Beijing Olympic, Fung Ka Ki hosted the program "Four Little continues strong" for the cable TV Hong Kong. Inside the episode, Fung and his crew focus on the passing of the Olympic torch relay in China. They visited and interviewed all the provinces throughout China.

Fung Ka Ki wrote and released a book, which is "Fung Ki's Football Journey", in August 2008. It is an autobiography of his life from his childhood days till 2008. It is published by Why Publishing. ISBN number: 978–962–678–532–4.

References

External links
 Fung Ka Ki at HKFA

1977 births
Hong Kong people
Hong Kong footballers
Hong Kong football managers
Association football defenders
Hong Kong Rangers FC players
Kitchee SC players
Association football commentators
Hong Kong First Division League players
Living people
Footballers at the 1998 Asian Games
Asian Games competitors for Hong Kong